George Thursfield (born 20 November 1893, date of death unknown) was a South African cyclist. He competed in two events at the 1920 Summer Olympics.

References

External links
 

1893 births
Year of death missing
South African male cyclists
Olympic cyclists of South Africa
Cyclists at the 1920 Summer Olympics
Sportspeople from Aldershot
English emigrants to South Africa